A referendum on legalising slot machines at greyhound racetracks was held in Guam on 5 January 2008. The proposal was rejected by 63% of voters.

Background
The proposal was introduced as part of the Better Jobs for Guam Act, but was rejected by 55% of voters in a 2006 referendum. A petition was launched after the referendum, and enough signatures were gathered between 4 December 2006 and 16 April 2007 to force another referendum. The referendum was initially scheduled for 15 December 2007, but was later moved to January 2008 by a court.

Results

References

2008 referendums
Referendums in Guam
2008 in Guam
Gambling referendums